Magnus Wahlström (October 28, 1903 in Surahammar Municipality, Sweden – January 30, 1972 in Bridgeport, Connecticut, USA), often Wahlstrom in English, was a Swedish American entrepreneur and later a philanthropist. He was married to Agnes (née Johnson); they had a daughter, Eleanora.

In his youth he worked on Surahammar's Mill, first in the office and then in the mechanical workshop. Wahlstrom moved to the United States in 1923. His first stop was Chicago. In Chicago he met another Swedish American, Rudolph Bannow (1897–1962).  Another friend was Gerhard 'Gerry' T. Rooth. Bannow and Wahlstrom founded the business that became Bridgeport Machines, Inc, a major machine tool builder famous for its milling machines.

The meeting with Bannow was the start of a successful partnership. The two began by producing electric hedge clippers. After much hard work, their first universal milling machine was built in 1932. By 1936, their company was called the Bridgeport Pattern and Model Works and was offering milling heads (the part of a mill where the spindle is) commercially. The American Precision Museum's biography of Rudolph Bannow reports that he conceived the iconic Bridgeport ram-and-turret, knee-and-column design in 1936 as the logical machine on which to mount the milling head already being built by the company. In 1938 they began selling whole milling machines. The company had now established itself as a machine tool builder named Bridgeport Machines, Inc. After getting into this business line, the company started to become very successful.

In 1968, the company was sold to Textron for US$101 million, about $850 million in 2014 values. Upon this sale, the company employed approximately 1000 people.

Wahlstrom donated a lot of time and money to charity. Among other things, he helped the poor in Bridgeport with rent and food. Wahlstrom also invested capital in the newspaper Nordstjernan in 1953 to help the newspaper to avoid bankruptcy.

The University of Bridgeport Library is named after his support to the university.

References

Cited sources

Further reading
Bridgeport Post
Encyclopedia

External links 
Bridgeport Machines Inc.
University of Bridgeport
City of Bridgeport
Vestmanlands Läns Tidning (newspaper)
Nordstjernan (newspaper)

Swedish emigrants to the United States
1903 births
1972 deaths
Burials at Mountain Grove Cemetery, Bridgeport
People from Bridgeport, Connecticut
People from Fairfield, Connecticut
Machine tool builders